Clinanthus is a genus of bulbous plants in the family Amaryllidaceae, found in western South America, from Ecuador to north west Argentina.

Species include:
Clinanthus callacallensis (Ravenna) Meerow 	
Clinanthus campodensis (Ravenna) Meerow 	
Clinanthus caracensis (Ravenna) Meerow 	
Clinanthus chihuanhuayu (Cárdenas) Meerow 	
Clinanthus coccineus (Ruiz & Pav.) Meerow 	
Clinanthus croceus (Savigny) Meerow 	
Clinanthus elwesii (Baker) Meerow 	
Clinanthus flammidus (Ravenna) Meerow 	
Clinanthus fulvus (Herb.) Meerow 	
Clinanthus glareosus (Ravenna) Meerow 	
Clinanthus humilis (Herb.) Meerow 	
Clinanthus imasumacc (Vargas) Meerow 	
Clinanthus incarnatus  (Kunth) Meerow 	
Clinanthus incarum (Kraenzl.) Meerow 	
Clinanthus luteus Herb. 	
Clinanthus macleanicus (Herb.) Meerow 	
Clinanthus microstephium (Ravenna) Meerow 	
Clinanthus mirabilis (Ravenna) Meerow 	
Clinanthus recurvatus (Ruiz & Pav.) Meerow 	
Clinanthus sunchubambae (Ravenna) Meerow 	
Clinanthus variegatus (Ruiz & Pav.) Meerow 	
Clinanthus viridiflorus (Ruiz & Pav.) Meerow

References

Amaryllidoideae
Amaryllidaceae genera